Birrana bulburin is a species of spiders in the family Zoropsidae, from Queensland, first described by Raven & Stumkat in 2005. It is the only species in the genus Birrana.

References

Zoropsidae
Spiders of Australia
Spiders described in 2005